St Kevin's College (also called Redcastle) in Oamaru, New Zealand, is a Catholic, coeducational, integrated, boarding and day, secondary school. It was founded by the Christian Brothers in 1927 for boys and became a co-educational school in 1983 when the Dominican Sisters closed down their school at Teschemakers. The College became a state integrated school in 1983. The Christian Brothers ceased to be on the teaching staff of the college in the late 1990s but remained the school's proprietor, and so appointed representatives to the college board, until 2019 when they transferred the ownership of St Kevin's College to the Bishop of Dunedin.

College
In 2019, St Kevin's College had a roll of about 450 students including approximately 80 boarding students and 370 day students. Its gender composition in 2019 was female 50% and Male 50%. In that year, the college's maximum roll under the Education Act 1989 was 465 pupils. In 2016, its ethnic composition was NZ European/Pākehā 70%, Asian 10%, Pacific 5% and Māori 10% and other 5%. St Kevin's College has a strong Catholic focus.

Character
In February 1983 St Kevin's became co-educational. Until 1979 girls boarded at Teschemakers,  a secondary school located about 12 km south of Oamaru. St Kevin's College currently has boarding capacity for over 100 girls. Also in 1983, the college was integrated as a College with a "special character" under the Private Schools Conditional Integration Act 1975. The special character is broadly the connection of the school with the Catholic faith. Preference of enrolment is given to students who have established a link with the Catholic Church through baptism or membership of a parish. Preference is decided by the appropriate parish priest in each case. A preference certificate from the student's parish is required for each student with their application for enrolment at the school. Under the Act, the school may enrol "non-preference" students but the enrolment of such students is restricted to 5% of the total roll.

Students come mainly from Oamaru and the surrounding rural areas (many of them ex-pupils of St Joseph's School, Oamaru) with some coming from more distant New Zealand and overseas locations. The school benefits from modern facilities and spacious grounds to provide, amongst other learning opportunities, an equestrian academy, a primary-industry trades academy, and opportunities in the media and a wide range of sports activities.

Sport
The college has produced seven All Blacks and one Silver Fern.  Students participate in many sports including: hockey, rugby, basketball, soccer, netball, swimming, rowing, cricket, tennis, squash, badminton, skiing, snowboarding, multi-sport, athletics, tramping and kayaking. Swimming, athletic and cross-country sports are particularly emphasised and all students participate. The college has its own golf course, swimming pool, turf and gymnasium. St Kevins strongly participates in Rugby competitions. There is an annual game with Waitaki Boys' High School (located near Redcastle) for the Leo O’Malley Memorial Trophy ("the peanut"). This attracts up to 5000 spectators in anticipation of a tight match. As at 2014, Waitaki was the more frequent winner hoisting the trophy on 53 occasions to St Kevin's 21 wins with 5 draws. This rivalry is often referred to as "the blooder" by St Kevin's students, originating from St Kevin's students calling Waitaki Boys blood nuts because of the colour of their blazers. The St Kevin's blazers are blue.

Media and performance
The College emphasises public speaking, singing, drama, debating, choirs, dance, reading aloud, role plays and scripture reading. Cultural activities, such as the annual choral festival and annual production, are timetabled into the school year so that all students are involved to some degree. The College participates in the annual Bishop's Shield Competition which it has won several times. Debating is also encouraged. Many students learn music and learn to play musical instruments within the school day. The college has music ensembles and some students play in groups and orchestras outside the college. There is a Chapel Choir for College liturgical events.

Boarding hostel
In 2019 a million-dollar upgrade of the five-building hostel block was commenced with the aim of attracting more boarding student enrolments. The improvements were funded by the Christian Brothers.

Rectors
 1927–1933: Brother B. F. Magee
 1933–1936: Brother M. M. O'Connor
 1936–1938: Brother J. B. Gettons
 1939–1945: Brother M. D. McCarthy BA
 1945–1951: Brother P. C. Ryan BA
 1951–1952: Brother J. A. Morris
 1953–1957: Brother J. I. Carroll BA, MusB
 1958–1961: Brother J. B. Duffy BA, BEd (Hons)
 1961–1967: Brother P. A. McManus BA, DipEd
 1968–1971: Brother J. M. Hessian BSc, MACE
 1972–1974: Brother P. A. Boyd
 1975–1979: Brother M. B. Scanlan BSc, DipEd
 1980–1996: Brother B. J. Lauren BA, TTC, DipEd, DipCat, DipRE
 1996–2001: Mr J. G. Boyle BA, DipTch
 2002–2010: Mr C. B. Russell BA, DipEd, DipTch
 2010–2021: Mr P. R. Olsen BSc, DipTch
 2022-present: Ms Jo Walshe  BA, Dip Tch, Grad Dip (Theo), Grad Dip (RelSt)

Origins

Proposal
The establishment of a Catholic boarding school for boys in Otago was first proposed 1890. However, it was not until 1925 that the preparations for the establishment began. The Bishop of Dunedin, James Whyte, asked the Christian Brothers to set up the school. They had, from 1876, conducted the Christian Brothers School in Dunedin. This school had for a time taken boarders in a hostel which operated from 1919 until 1924. Various sites were inspected by the Bishop and the Provincial of the Christian Brothers,  P. I. Hickey, and the property called "Redcastle" in Oamaru was chosen as the most suitable site.

Campus
The site of the college was originally developed by the McLean and Buckley families. John McLean was born on the island of Mull, Scotland, in 1818. He (with his brothers) made his fortune in developing and exploiting High Country sheep stations (particularly "Morven Hills" in the Lindis Pass) and by selling them at the right time.

McLean purchased the Oamaru land in 1857 as part of much larger block for about 10/- an acre. Much of it was sold off, but he retained the area which is now the school, and he resided there from the 1860s. By 1871 he was running 10,000 sheep on the property. He was the Oamaru member for the Otago Provincial Council and he was also a member of the New Zealand Legislative Council (1867–1872). He died in 1902 and the land passed to his nephew, St John McLean Buckley.

The original homestead was one-storied with a thatched roof. When the old house burned down, Buckley built the red brick residence with Oamaru stone facing, now known as the "Castle" and, since he was very fond of horse-racing, he built large stables (a building now named "The Stables"), St John Buckley died in 1915 and his son, also named John Buckley, sold the property to a syndicate of local people. The property was called "Redcastle".

Redcastle was known for its beauty and its sporting associations (particularly those of St John McLean Buckley – He was, apart from his horse racing interests, president of cycling, coursing, gymnastic and tennis clubs). The homestead (the "castle") was (and is) a significant country house. The property comprising  was purchased by the Christian Brothers at a cost of £8000 in 1925 and a further  were added, at a cost of £1000, in 1928. The present campus thus has an area of 27 hectares.

In May 1926, Brother Moore, who had experience in fund-raising, came to Dunedin to organise a bazaar and lottery to fund the purchase of the land and the establishment of the college. His confrere, Brother Dowd, toured the country districts to collect donations. These initiatives resulted in a fund of £7000. In 1926, the construction of the buildings began under the supervision of Brother Prunster.

Commencement
The college was named after the Irish saint, Kevin (498–618), the founder of the monastery and school of Glendalough. The blessing and opening of the college took place on Sunday, 6 February 1927. There were several Bishops present: Archbishop Redwood and Bishops O'Shea, Whyte, Cleary, Brodie and Liston. There were many priests and more than 2,500 friends and well-wishers present coming from Dunedin and nearby parts of both Otago and Canterbury. Classes commenced on Tuesday, 8 February 1927. There were 60 boarders and 31 day students. The Christian Brothers on the first staff were Brother Magee (the Rector) and Brothers Bowler, Brennan, Le Breton, Dowd, Ryan, Mills and Maye. The Rector of Waitaki Boys' High School, Frank Milner, was present at the opening. When Frank Milner ("a firm friend of St Kevin's") died in 1944, the St Kevin's Boys formed a guard of honour for his remains as they left the church after the funeral service.

Ethos
For its first 55 years, St Kevin's College was typical of Christian Brother boarding institutions in Australia and New Zealand. They were designed to provide a Catholic education for the sons of rural Catholic families. For the Christian Brothers they were places of particularly hard work. Individual Brothers taught throughout the day, coached sports teams after school, supervised meals and study, and were responsible for the dormitories at night. The Brothers generally had to be young men with energy.

Notable alumni

The college has produced 19 Christian Brothers and 7 Brothers belonging to other Religious Orders, 101 Priests, 1 Bishop, 1 Archbishop (who was also a cardinal). In sport, 2 Silver Ferns and 7 All Blacks (including 3 captains) have been students at St Kevin's.

Notable former students include:
 Maree Bowden – a New Zealand netball international.
 Leonard Anthony Boyle (1930–2016) – Fifth Bishop of Dunedin (1983–2005)
 Kevin Brady CNZM (born 14 June 1947) - the 17th Controller and Auditor-General of New Zealand 2002 - 2009
 Dan Buckingham – Olympic Paralympian athlete
 Donald John Cameron (born Dunedin 20 February 1933), journalist and sportswriter.
 Thomas Desmond Coughlan – All Blacks flanker, 1958
 Peter Gresham – Member of Parliament for Waitotara (1990–1993) and Whanganui (1993–1996), list MP (1996–1999); Minister of Social Welfare and Minister of Senior Citizens (1996–1999)
 Gavan Herlihy – Member of Parliament for Otago (1996–2002)
 James Charles Kearney – All Blacks first five-eighth, 1947–1949
 Kevin Francis Laidlaw – All Blacks centre three-quarter, 1960
 Francis Steven McAtamney – All Blacks prop, 1956
 William Alexander McCaw – All Blacks Captain 1954, Number 8 and flanker, 1951–1954
 John Robert McKinnon, Ophthalmologist; mountaineer; and the first volunteer doctor at Kunde Hospital
 Denzil Meuli (Pierre Denzil) (1926 – 2019) – priest of the Diocese of Auckland, writer, former editor of the Zealandia and a leading New Zealand traditionalist Catholic
 Alec Neill – Member of Parliament for Waitaki (1990–1996), List MP (1999, 2001 and 2002)
 Matt Saunders - professional rugby union player.
 Cyril Laurence (Larry) Siegert (1923 – 2007), Air Vice Marshal –  Chief of Air Force (New Zealand) (1976 to 1979)
 Kevin Lawrence Skinner – All Blacks captain 1952; prop, 1949–1956; champion heavy weight boxer
 Robert Charles Stuart – All Blacks captain, Loose forward 1949–1954; rugby coach, and WW2 naval commander
Jane Watson - New Zealand netball international (2016 - ).
Gordon Whiting (1942 – 2018) – Judge
 Thomas Williams  (born 20 March 1930) – Cardinal, Archbishop Emeritus of Wellington.

See also
 St Joseph's School, Oamaru
 St Patrick's Basilica, Oamaru
 Congregation of Christian Brothers in New Zealand
 Roman Catholic Diocese of Dunedin

Notes

References

 J.C. O'Neill, The History of the Work of the Christian Brothers in New Zealand, unpublished Dip. Ed. thesis, University of Auckland, 1968.
 Redcastle Recollections, A Golden Jubilee Volume, St Kevin's College, Oamaru, 1977.
 Robert Pinney, Early Northern Otago Runs, Collins, Auckland, 1981.
 Paul Malcolm Robertson, Nga Parata Karaitiana The Christian Brothers, A Public Culture in Transition, A Comparative Study of the Indian and New Zealand Provinces, an unpublished thesis for MA in Anthropology, University of Auckland, 1996.
 Graeme Donaldson, To All Parts of the Kingdom: Christian Brothers In New Zealand 1876–2001, Christian Brothers New Zealand Province, Christchurch, 2001.
 St Kevin's College website (Retrieved 2 September 2014)

Congregation of Christian Brothers secondary schools
Congregation of Christian Brothers in New Zealand
Secondary schools in Otago
Dominican schools in New Zealand
Buildings and structures in Oamaru
Educational institutions established in 1927
Boarding schools in New Zealand
Catholic secondary schools in New Zealand
1927 establishments in New Zealand